Empire Arrow was a steam powered oil tanker which was launched in 1921 and scrapped in 1939.

History

Empire Arrow was built by New York Shipbuilding Corporation, Camden, New Jersey. She was launched on 21 May 1921 and completed in September. She was the last ship built on South Yard Shipway No 2.  Empire Arrow was built for the Standard Transportation Co Inc, In 1931, she was transferred to the Standard-Vacuum Transportato Co. In 1934, she was sold to the Socony-Vacuum Oil Co. Empire Arrow was scrapped by Northern Metals Co, Philadelphia. She arrived for scrapping on 10 January 1939.

Propulsion

Empire Arrow was powered by a quadruple expansion steam engine of  built by New York Shipbuilding Corporation. The engine drove a single screw.

Official number and code letters

Official numbers were a forerunner to IMO Numbers.

Empire Arrow had the US Official number 221600. Empire Arrow used the code letters MDOT until 1934 and KDUG from 1934.

References

External links
 Launch photo, ship's data in caption

1921 ships
Ships built by New York Shipbuilding Corporation
Steamships of the United States
Tankers of the United States
Oil tankers